Anna Savage may refer to:

Anna Blake (Hollyoaks), a character from the TV series Hollyoaks
Anna Shipton (née Savage; 1815–1901), Christian writer
Anna Savage (born Anna Chase Rich; died 1883), first wife of Ezra P. Savage

See also
 Anne Savage (disambiguation)